Nemertoscolex is a genus of ribbon worms belonging to the family Lineidae.

The species of this genus are found in Northern Europe.

Species:
 Nemertoscolex parasiticus Greeff, 1879

References

Lineidae
Nemertea genera